Bar Soloveychik (בר סולובייצ'יק; born August 15, 2000) is an Israeli swimmer. He holds the Israeli national records in both the 400m freestyle, and the 800m free. At the 2018 European Junior Swimming Championships, he won a gold medal as part of Israel's 4×200 m freestyle relay. He attends the University of Minnesota, where he has swum sprint, mid-distance, and distance events, and holds school records in the 200 free and 500 free. He won a gold medal at the 2022 Maccabiah Games in the 400 m freestyle. He competes in 1500 m freestyle, 200 m freestyle, 400 m freestyle, 7.5 km open water, 800 m freestyle, 4x200 m freestyle, and 4x200m freestyle mixed.

Early life
His parents are Anatoly and Marina Soloveychik, and he lives in Kiryat Motzkin, Israel. He has two siblings, Itay and Aviel. He graduated in 2021 from Makif Hof HaSharon.

Swimming career
Soloveychik is a member of Maccabi Kiryat Bialik swim club. 

He holds the Israeli national records in both the 400m freestyle (3:49.77 in March 2021 at the 2021 Union Cup in Israel, when he was 20 years old), and the 800m free (7:55.48 in June 2021, beating his own record by four seconds).

He competed at the 2017 European Junior Swimming Championships. At the 2018 European Junior Swimming Championships, in Helsinki, Finland, Soloveychik won a gold medal as part of Israel's 4×200 m freestyle relay.

At the 2019 Israeli Short Course Championships, Soloveychik won a bronze medal in the 400 freestyle (3:47.82), and a silver medal in the 1,500 freestyle (15:14.13). At the Swim Cup Amsterdam meet, he took 4th place in the 400 and 1,500 freestyles (3:53.94 and 15:34.87 respectively), and 5th place in the 800 LCM freestyle (8:08.00).

In December 2020, he won the Israel Winter Olympic Trials title in the 800, with a 8:01.83, and the 1500 free.

Soloveychik placed first in the 800m free, and third in the 200m free, at the 2021 Israeli National Summer Championships. He  took first in both the 400m and 800m freestyles at the 2021 Israeli Union Cup. He competed at the 2019 World University Games, in Naples, Italy. 

He competed at the 2017 Maccabiah Games. At the 2022 Maccabiah Games, Soloveychik broke the record that had stood for 33 years in the 400 m freestyle, winning in a record time of 3:54.75. After the race, he said: “I feel very proud to compete in the Maccabiah and break the Maccabiah record, especially since it is a very special record that has stood for decades."

Soloveychik attends the University of Minnesota, where competing for the Minnesota Golden Gophers he has swum sprint, mid-distance, and distance events. He holds school record in 200 free (1:33.56) and 500 free (4:12.76) At his NCAA Championships debut at the 2022 NCAA Division I Men's Swimming and Diving Championships in Atlanta, Georgia, Soloveychik placed 13th in the 500 free (4:13.51), 41st in the 200 free (1:34.32), and set the school record in the 500 free prelims (4:12.76).

At the 2022 Big Ten Men's Swimming and Diving Championships in West Lafayette, Indiana, he was a three-time finalist, as Soloveychik finished fourth in the 500 y free finals (a school record 4:13.85), fifth in the 200 y free finals (1:33.80), and eighth in the 1650 y free (15:00.14). He was also part of the 800 free relay that placed fifth (6:22.25), leading off with a school record 1:33.56 in the 200 free. 

Soloveychik was named College Swimming Coaches Association of America (CSCAA) 2021-22 First Team Scholar All-American He was named 2022 Honorable Mention All-American.  

At the May 2022 Israel Swimming Cup in Netanya, Israel, Soloveychik won the 400 freestyle in a time of 3:51.95.

See also
List of Israeli records in swimming

References 

2000 births
Living people
Competitors at the 2022 Maccabiah Games
Competitors at the 2017 Maccabiah Games
Competitors at the 2019 Summer Universiade
Israeli male freestyle swimmers
Maccabiah Games medalists in swimming
Maccabiah Games gold medalists for Israel
Minnesota Golden Gophers men's swimmers
People from Kiryat Motzkin
21st-century Israeli people